Anti-tank guns are typically high-velocity guns designed to fire anti-tank shells.  They are usually designed to be easily transported and concealed to maximize responsiveness and surprise.

Towed anti-tank guns

Self-propelled anti-tank guns 

Self-propelled anti-tank guns are anti-tank guns mounted on vehicles.  Sometimes lightly armored, and often fitted into a turret, they are none-the-less not tanks or assault guns and simply enhance the mobility of anti-tank guns.  They are also capable of providing direct fire support.

References and citations

References
 Zaloga, Steven J., James Grandsen (1984). Soviet Tanks and Combat Vehicles of World War Two, London: Arms and Armour Press. .

Anti-tank
List